Stemonitidales is an order of Amoebozoan slime molds in the class Myxomycetes.

References

Amoebozoa orders
Myxogastria